Angers – Loire Airport is an airport located in Marcé,  northeast of Angers, both communes of the Maine-et-Loire department in the Pays de la Loire region of France. It is also known as Angers – Marcé Airport.

Facilities 

Airlines and destinations 
In April 2017, when Air France Hop announced a service to Bastia, the airport was not served by any scheduled commercial traffic. Previously, Angers was served during the summer by two airlines: British Airways to London-City and IGavion (operated by SkyTaxi) to Nice and Toulouse. As of April 2021, Air France Hop cancelled its sole seasonal route to Bastia which it ran since 2017 As of November 30, 2022, the airport has no scheduled passenger flights.

Statistics

References

External links
 Angers Loire Aéroport, official site 
 Aéroport d'Angers Loire at Union des Aéroports Français  
 
 

Airports in Pays de la Loire
Buildings and structures in Maine-et-Loire
Airports established in 1998
Transport in Maine-et-Loire